Marie of Harcourt (9 September 1398 – 19 April 1476) was a ruling Countess of Aumale and Baroness of Elbeuf from 1452 to 1476.

Life
She was the eldest daughter of John VII of Harcourt, Count of Harcourt and Aumale and Baron of Elbeuf, and of Marie of Alençon.

On 12 August 1416 she married Antoine of Lorraine (1400–1458), Count of Vaudémont and sire of Joinville.

Upon the death of her father in 1452, she attempted to claim the entire Harcourt inheritance, to the exclusion of her younger sister Jeanne of Harcourt. By 1454, Jeanne had established herself as Countess of Aumale, and Marie as Countess of Harcourt and Baroness of Elbeuf. These lands were to pass to her second son, John, but he predeceased her in 1473, so they went to her grandson Rene.

Issue
 Frederic II of Vaudémont (1428–1470), count of Vaudémont and sire of Joinville, in 1445 married Yolande, Duchess of Lorraine of Anjou. Together Frederic and Yolande had six children.
 Jean of Lorraine, Count of Harcourt (died 1473), comte of Harcourt and of Aumale and baron of Elbeuf
 Henri (died 1505), bishop of Thérouanne (1447–1484), then of Metz (1484–1505)
 Marie (died 23 April 1455), in 1450 married Alain IX (died 1462), viscount of Rohan
 Marguerite of Lorraine, Dame d'Aerschot and de Bierbeke (died before 1474), in 1432 married Antoine I de Croy, Seigneur de Croy.

References 

1398 births
1476 deaths
French countesses
House of Harcourt
Aumale, Countess of, Marie of Harcourt
14th-century French women
14th-century French people
15th-century French women
15th-century French people
15th-century women rulers